Andreas Romdhane (a.k.a. Quiz) and Josef Larossi are a Swedish production duo. They have a studio based in the centre of Stockholm, Sweden. They have worked together since 1999 when they wrote songs for Lutricia McNeal.

During their partnership, they have written/produced songs for a wide variety of acts such as Kelly Clarkson, The Pussycat Dolls, Il Divo, Geri Halliwell, Diana Ross, Alexandra Burke, The Saturdays and Westlife.

They have had six #1 singles in the UK. Quiz and Larossi have written eight songs for Il Divo in the last three years, the largest number of songs from any contributing songwriter. Il Divo has to this day sold 28 million albums worldwide.

They were claimed by Music Business Worldwide to have been commissioned by Spotify to produce tracks for playlists under various pseudonyms (including Deep Watch, Piotr Miteska, Evolution of Stars, Karin Borg, Antologie, Bon Vie, Benny Bernstein, and The 2 Inversions).

Discography 
Examples of songs that Quiz & Larossi have written and/or produced:

Songs/Productions
 "Don't Let Me Stop You" - Kelly Clarkson (US #1 album)
 "I will pray (Pregherò)" - Giorgia & Alicia Keys
 "I Like It" - JLS
 "Another One" - Conor Maynard (UK #1 album)
 “Here & Now” - STEPS (UK Top 5 Single)
 "Crazy In Love" - Sofia Karlberg (UK Top 20 Single)
 "Twilight" - Cover Drive (UK #1 single)
 "Make You Mine" (Additional production and remix) - Talay Riley
 "Candy" - Aggro Santos featuring Kimberly Wyatt (UK #3 single)
 "Up" - The Saturdays (Chasing Lights) (UK #5 single)
 "Hallelujah" - Alexandra Burke  (UK#1 Most sold single of 2008)
 "Hush Hush; Hush Hush" - The Pussycat Dolls (Doll Domination) (#1 single in Russia & Ukraine)
 "Hero" (with The X Factor Finalists 2008)  (UK #1 2nd most sold single of 2008)
 "The Rose" - Westlife (#1 UK single)
 "Wake Up Call" - Hayden Panettiere
 "When You Tell Me That You Love Me" - Diana Ross (#2 UK single)
 "Ride It" - Geri Halliwell (#4 UK Single)
 "Don't Say It's Too Late" - Westlife (#1 UK Album World of Our Own)
 "Cradle" - Atomic Kitten
 "I Didn't Want You Anyway" - Hear’Say (#1 UK Album Popstars)
 "365 Days" - Lutricia McNeal
 "You Don't Love Me" - Stephanie McIntosh (from the album Tightrope #4 AUS)
 "Like U Like" - Aggro Santos & Kimberley Walsh
 "Bombo" - Adelén (2nd place in Norwegian national final for the Eurovision Song Contest.)
 "In Your Head" - Mohombi
 "Love Sux" - Linda Teodosiu (#24 in Germany & #72 in Austria)

Il Divo
 "Mama" - Il Divo  (#1 Album in 13 countries. Only single commercially released from the album)
 "Sei Parte Ormai Di Me" - Il Divo
 "The Man You Love" - Il Divo
 "Isabel" - Il Divo (#1 US Album. #1 Album in 15 countries)
 "Una Noche" - Il Divo (#1 Album on the World Chart)
 "Enamorado" - Il Divo
 "Angelina" - Il Divo
 "La Luna" - Il Divo

References

Swedish songwriters